__notoc__

Mark Olshaker (born February 28, 1951) is an American author from Washington, D.C. who frequently collaborates with FBI agent John E. Douglas in writing books about criminal and investigative psychology. In 1995, they formed Mindhunters, Inc. and later released Mindhunter: Inside the FBI's Elite Serial Crime Unit, which was made into a Netflix series Mindhunter in 2017.

Olshaker worked with public health scientist, Michael Osterholm, detailing the medical system's lack of preparation for another pandemic in their book Deadliest Enemy: Our War Against Killer Germs. In his New York Times article "We’re Not Ready for a Flu Pandemic", Olshaker criticized the lack of funding the government invested in developing a flu vaccine, citing the National Institutes of Health only received $32 million and Biomedical Advanced Research received $43 million for such research in 2017.

Olshaker is a supporter of victims' rights.

Publications
 Douglas, John E., Mark Olshaker. Mindhunter: Inside the FBI's Elite Serial Crime Unit. New York: Scribner. 1995. 
 Douglas, John E., Mark Olshaker. Journey into Darkness. New York: Scribner. 1997. 
 Douglas, John E., Mark Olshaker. Obsession: The FBI's Legendary Profiler Probes the Psyches of Killers, Rapists and Stalkers and Their Victims and Tells How to Fight Back. New York: Scribner. 1998. 
 Douglas, John E., Mark Olshaker. The Anatomy of Motive: The FBI's Legendary Mindhunter Explores the Key to Understanding and Catching Violent Criminals. New York: Scribner. 1999. 
 Douglas, John E., Mark Olshaker. The Cases That Haunt Us. New York: Scribner. 2000. 
 Douglas, John E., Mark Olshaker. Law & Disorder. New York: Kensington 2013. 
 Douglas, John E., Mark Olshaker. The Killer Across the Table: Unlocking the Secrets of Serial Killers and Predators with the FBI's Original Mindhunter. New York: HarperCollins. 2020. 
 Douglas, John E., Mark Olshaker. The Killer's Shadow: The FBI's Hunt for a White Supremacist Serial Killer. Dey Street Books. 2020
 Douglas, John E., Mark Olshaker. When a Killer Calls: A Haunting Story of Murder, Criminal Profiling, and Justice in a Small Town. Dey Street Books. 2022

Fiction
 Douglas, John E., Mark Olshaker. Broken Wings (Mindhunters). Atria. 1999.

See also

Crime Classification Manual
FBI Method of Profiling
Forensic psychology
Investigative psychology
Offender profiling
John E. Douglas

References

External links
Mindhunters website

ISNI: 0000 0004 5302 740X

Offender profiling
1951 births
Living people
American horror writers
George Washington University alumni
Writers from Washington, D.C.
American male non-fiction writers
20th-century American male writers
20th-century American non-fiction writers
21st-century American male writers
21st-century American non-fiction writers